Aloe 'Adrienne' is a vigorous, medium-sized aloe with bi-coloured flowers in mid winter. It grows easily and its structured, slightly re-curved grey leaves with pronounced marginal spines make it a desirable specimen for various applications. It is by and large disease resistant. 
 Cultivation: Sun, little or much water, rich soil.
 Size: Small cluster, up to 0.6 metres
 Flowering time: June to July.
 Cold Tolerance: -60 C
 Released: 2009

References

External links
 www.dewetenviro.co.za

Adrienne
Ornamental plant cultivars